Lonnie Jerome Roberts (born October 6, 1937), was an American politician who was a member of the Oregon House of Representatives.

Roberts was born in Portland in 1937. He attended the University of Portland and Marylhurst College, earning a Master of Science degree in political science. He worked as a consultant and as a trucker. He later served as County Commissioner of Multnomah County, Oregon.

References

1937 births
Living people
Democratic Party members of the Oregon House of Representatives
Politicians from Portland, Oregon
University of Portland alumni
Marylhurst University alumni
Multnomah County Commissioners